Khalil ibn Ishaq al-Jundi (died ), also known as Sidi Khalil, was an Egyptian jurisprudent in Maliki Islamic law who taught in Medina and Cairo. His Mukhtasar, known as the "Mukhtasar of Khalil", is considered an epitome of shariah law according to the Maliki madhhab, and is regarded as the most authoritative legal manual by North and West African Muslims.

See also

 List of Ash'aris and Maturidis

References

Asharis
Sunni Muslim scholars of Islam
Egyptian Sunni Muslims
Egyptian Maliki scholars
14th-century deaths
Year of birth unknown
14th-century jurists